Lake Tritriva is a volcanic lake in southwest-central Madagascar, in the region of Vàkinankàratra, located near the village of Belazao. In a distance of 15 km from Antsirabe, it is easy to reach by the National Road 34.

There's a strict Fady (taboo) for this lake and swimming is not allowed.

The lake fills an extinct crater in a region notable also for the presence of many hot springs. It sits in the vent of an oval volcanic cone enclosed in vertical gneiss cliffs. The lake's water level drops during the rainy season and rises when the monsoon rains have ceased.

Gallery

References

Lakes of Madagascar
Volcanoes of Madagascar
Extinct volcanoes